"Generous" is a song by American singer and actress Olivia Holt. Released as a single on September 22, 2017, by Hollywood Records, it became her first number one on Billboards Dance Club Songs chart in its March 17, 2018 issue.

Music video
The music video was directed by Chris Applebaum. It was premiered on Vevo and YouTube on September 26, 2017.

Charts

Release history

References

2017 singles
Hollywood Records singles
Songs written by Fransisca Hall
Songs written by Mozella